The Virginia House of Delegates election of 1989 was held on Tuesday, November 7. Primary elections were held on June 13, 1989.

Results

Overview 

Source

See also 
 1989 United States elections
 1989 Virginia elections
 1989 Virginia gubernatorial election
 1989 Virginia lieutenant gubernatorial election
 1989 Virginia Attorney General election

References 

House of Delegates
Virginia
Virginia House of Delegates elections